The Night the Bridge Fell Down is an American disaster film starring James MacArthur, Desi Arnaz Jr., and Leslie Nielsen.  The movie was produced by Irwin Allen in 1979 in association with Warner Bros. Television for NBC but was not aired in the United States until February 28, 1983 – the same night the final original episode of M*A*S*H ("Goodbye, Farewell and Amen") aired on rival network CBS. (ABC showed American Gigolo).

The fictional Madison Bridge is represented by the Astoria-Megler Bridge on the Columbia River, the longest continuous truss bridge in North America.

Plot
Engineer Cal Miller's unauthorized attempt to close off the dangerously unstable Madison Bridge is foiled by the police pursuit of a robbery suspect. The chase ends in a multi-car accident in the middle of the bridge, which begins falling apart during the confusion. Miller organizes a rescue operation for the handful of bystanders who find themselves stranded with the armed suspect and a wounded policeman on a short stretch of crumbling pavement high atop a single collapsing pylon.

Cast

 James MacArthur as Cal Miller
 Desi Arnaz Jr. as Johnny Pyle
 Char Fontane as Dee
 Richard Gilliland as Harvey Lewis
 Leslie Nielsen as Paul Warren
 Eve Plumb as Terry Kelly
 Barbara Rush as Elaine Howard
 Gregory Sierra as Diego Ramirez
 Phillip Baker Hall as Warren Meech

Production
The casting of Eve Plumb and Barbara Rush was announced in July 1979.

Reception
The show fared poorly in the ratings against the last episode of MASH,  which attracted the largest audience for any single show in television history. It had 10 percent of the viewers in New York, 12 percent in Los Angeles and 5 percent in San Francisco.

References

External links

1983 films
1983 television films
1980s disaster films
1980s English-language films
American disaster films
Disaster television films
Films directed by Georg Fenady
Films produced by Irwin Allen
Films scored by Richard LaSalle
NBC network original films
1980s American films